Desi Romeos is a 2012 Punjabi film produced by Babbu Maan, starring Babbu Maan and Harjit Harman in lead roles.

Cast
 Babbu Maan - Randhawa
 Harjit Harman - Sandhu 
 Shilpa Dhar - Urmilla
 Jasneer Kaur - Lali
 Bhupinder Gill - DJ Jaggadi
 Bittu - Om
 Mitesh - Oshu
 Jasprem Dhillon - Mirza
 Raavi Bal - Ehsaaz
 Sherry Uppal - Manna

Plot 

Desi Romeos is the story of six boys who are popular in college for their music which leads to jealousy of Mirza group.Desi Romeos is also the story of their journey from the days of the hostel to house no. 55, where they stay on rent and where romance blossoms between them and the girls staying as PG  in the house opposite them to the jail. Who called upon by people as good for nothing, achieve success through their musical talent.'Desi Romeos' contains much action, romance and music.

Music 

Music was released on 25 May.

Track Listings

"Kabootri" (Remix)
"Output Zero"
"Sohaniyan"
"Sardari"
"Chandigarh"
"Mutiyar"
"Why Don't You"
"Kabootri"

References

Punjabi-language Indian films
2010s Punjabi-language films